Djelloul Djouba (born April 2, 1992) is an Algerian footballer who is currently unattached. Djouba was part of the Algeria national under-17 football team that finished as runner-ups at the 2009 African U-17 Championship and also played at the 2009 FIFA U-17 World Cup.

References

External links
 

1992 births
Algerian footballers
Algerian Ligue Professionnelle 1 players
Living people
ASO Chlef players
Algeria youth international footballers
Association football midfielders
21st-century Algerian people